Irina Liuliakova (Irina Vasil'yevna Lyulyakova) is a Soviet figure skater. She represented the Soviet Union at the 1959 European Figure Skating Championships, placing 27th.

Biography 
She started training in figure skating in 1952 at the Young Pioneers Stadium in Moscow.

Competitive highlights

References

External links 
 Irina Liuliakova at Fskate.ru

1945 births
Living people
Soviet female single skaters
Figure skaters from Moscow